Terry Bunting (born c. 1935) is a retired Canadian football player who played for the Saskatchewan Roughriders.

References

Living people
1930s births
Canadian football guards
Saskatchewan Roughriders players